This is a list of the first minority male lawyer(s) and judge(s) in Arkansas. It includes the year in which the men were admitted to practice law (in parentheses). Also included are other distinctions such as the first minority men in their state to graduate from law school or become a political figure.

Firsts in Arkansas' history

Lawyer 

 First African American male: Thomas P. Johnson (1866)

State judges 

 First African American male (justice of the peace): John Milo Alexander 
 First African American male: Mifflin Wistar Gibbs in 1873 
 First African American male (Arkansas Supreme Court): George Howard Jr. (1954) in 1977
 First African American male (Arkansas Court of Appeals): George Howard Jr. (1954) in 1979
 First African American male (Eleventh Judicial District Court): Jesse Kearney (1979) in 1988 
 First African American male (county court): Henry "Hank" Wilkins IV in 2017

Federal judges 

First Jewish American male (U.S. District Court for the Eastern District of Arkansas): Jacob Trieber in 1900 
First African American male (U.S. District Courts for the Eastern and Western Districts of Arkansas): George Howard Jr. (1954) in 1980
First African American male (Chief Judge; U.S. Court of Appeals for the Eighth Circuit in Arkansas): Lavenski Smith (1987) in 2017

Attorney General of Arkansas 

 First African American male: Leon Johnson in 2003

Assistant Attorney General 

 First African American male: Rob Morehead

Arkansas Bar Association 

 First African American male admitted: Wiley A. Branton, Sr. (1952)
 First African American male (president): Eddie Haywood Walker Jr. in 2015

Firsts in local history 
 Henry "Hank" Wilkins IV: First African American male to serve as a county court judge in Jefferson County, Arkansas (2017)
 Guillermo Hernández: First Latino American male lawyer to practice immigration law in Little Rock [Pulaski County, Arkansas]
 Silas Herbert Hunt: First African American male admitted to the University of Arkansas School of Law (1948)
 Chris Mercer and George W.B. Haley: Among the "six pioneers" who integrated the University of Arkansas School of Law (1949)
 Joseph Wood: First African American male judge in Washington County, Arkansas (2016)

See also 

 List of first minority male lawyers and judges in the United States

Other topics of interest 

 List of first women lawyers and judges in the United States
 List of first women lawyers and judges in Arkansas

References 

 
Minority, Arkansas, first
Minority, Arkansas, first
Lawyers and judges
Arkansas lawyers
law